Rhodoplanes roseus is a phototrophic bacterium from the genus of Rhodoplanes which has been isolated from a duck pond in Cambridge in New Zealand.

References

External links
Type strain of Rhodoplanes roseus at BacDive -  the Bacterial Diversity Metadatabase

 

Nitrobacteraceae
Bacteria described in 1994